Haplospiza  is a small genus of birds in the tanager family Thraupidae. Formerly classified in the bunting and American sparrow family Emberizidae, more recent studies have shown it to belong in the Thraupidae. Its two members breed in subtropical or tropical moist forest in Central and South America. They are often associated with bamboo.

Taxonomy and species list
The genus Haplospiza was introduced in 1851 by the German ornithologist Jean Cabanis with the uniform finch as the type species. The name combines the Ancient Greek haploos meaning "plain" with spiza meaning "finch".

The genus contains two species:

A molecular phylogenetic study published in 2014 found that H. unicolor and H. rustica are not sister species.

References

External links
 BirdLife International 2004.  Haplospiza unicolor.   2006 IUCN Red List of Threatened Species.   Downloaded on 26 July 2007.
 BirdLife International 2004.  Haplospiza rustica.   2006 IUCN Red List of Threatened Species.   Downloaded on 26 July 2007.

 
Bird genera